Nathalie Porte (born 2 February 1973) is a French politician. She served as a member of the National Assembly representing the Calvados's 3rd constituency between 2020 and 2022 and is a member of The Republicans. She lost her seat in the first round of the 2022 French legislative election.

References

1973 births
Living people
Deputies of the 15th National Assembly of the French Fifth Republic
Members of the Regional Council of Normandy
Politicians from Normandy
People from Rodez
Women members of the National Assembly (France)
The Republicans (France) politicians
21st-century French women politicians